Convicted Felons is the fifth studio album from Turk and was released on September 5, 2006. As of December 2008, the album has sold around 20,000 copies.

Track listing
 Convicted Felons [Intro] - (1:13)
 Bout Dat Foolishness (feat. Ke'Noe) - (4:25)
 Nick Nac (feat. Jay {of Tha Night Rydas}) - (3:22)
 I Don't Know What's Wrong (feat. Nio & Handy) - (3:50) 
 What U Drinkin' On (feat. Ke'Noe & Thugga) - (2:44)
 S.S. Exclusive - (4:45)
 Suga-Suga Exclusive - (4:24)
 Get Rich (feat. Ke'Noe & Twisted Black) - (4:26)
 Gucci Mane Exclusive - (4:08)
 4 And A Half Exclusive - (3:53)
 Who You Hang With (feat. Ghetto Commission & Ke'Noe) - (2:47) 
 We Gettin' Fucked Up (feat. S.S. & Phillip Buchanan)(4:14)
 Mr. Marcelo Exclusive (2:54)
 4 and a Half Exclusive (5:43)
 Naked Feet (feat. Nio, Ke'Noe & D.I.G)(3:15)

2006 albums
Turk (rapper) albums